The Former Yan (337–370) was a dynastic state ruled by the Xianbei during the era of Sixteen Kingdoms in China.

Initially, Murong Huang and his son Murong Jun claimed the Jin dynasty-created title "Prince of Yan," but subsequently, in 352, after seizing most of the former Later Zhao territory, Murong Jun would declare himself emperor, and after that point, the rulers of the Former Yan declared themselves "emperors".

History
During the winter of 342, the Xianbei of Former Yan, ruled by the Murong clan, attacked and destroyed Goguryeo's capital, Hwando, capturing 50,000 Goguryeo men and women to use as slave labor in addition to taking the queen mother and queen prisoner, and forced King Gogukwon to flee for a while. The Xianbei also devastated Buyeo in 346, accelerating Buyeo migration to the Korean peninsula.

Their capital was Yan (Beijing) in 350, then Yecheng in 357, and finally Luoyang in 364.

Rulers of the Former Yan

See also
Xianbei
List of past Chinese ethnic groups
Wu Hu

References 

 
Tuyuhun
History of Mongolia
337 establishments
370 disestablishments
4th century in China
Dynasties in Chinese history
Former countries in Chinese history
4th-century establishments in China
Former monarchies